Hossein Jahanbanian (born April 2, 1976) is an Iranian former professional road cyclist.

Major results

2005
 1st Stage 3 Milad De Nour Tour
2006
 3rd Road race, National Road Championships
 7th Overall Tour of Iran (Azerbaijan)
 8th Overall Kerman Tour
2007
 1st Stage 1 Kerman Tour
 1st Stage 3 Milad De Nour Tour
 6th Overall Jelajah Malaysia
2008
 3rd Overall Tour d'Indonesia
1st Stage 3
 7th Overall Milad De Nour Tour
2009
 9th Overall Tour of Iran (Azerbaijan)
2010
 National Road Championships
2nd Road race
3rd Time trial
2011
 1st  Overall Tour de East Java
 3rd Overall Tour de Brunei
 9th Overall Tour of Thailand
2014
 4th Road race, National Road Championships

References

1976 births
Living people
Iranian male cyclists
21st-century Iranian people